Wu Xuanyi (born January 26, 1995), is a Chinese singer and actress. She began her career in 2016, as a member of the South Korean girl group WJSN. She took a hiatus from the group in the first half of 2018 to compete as a contestant in Tencent Video's survival reality show, Produce 101 China, finishing in second place and joining the Chinese project girl group Rocket Girls 101 until June 2020. Following the disbandment of the project group, she remained on hiatus from WJSN to pursue a solo career in China until she left the group on March 3, 2023.

Early life
Wu was born in Hainan, China. She joined Yuehua Entertainment, moved to South Korea around 2014 to 2015 and joined Starship Entertainment where she became a trainee.

Career

2015–2016: Debut with WJSN 

On December 4, 2015, Starship Entertainment and Yuehua Entertainment introduced a 12-member Chinese-South Korean girl group WJSN. Wu was introduced as a member of "Joy Unit". Together with Wonder Unit, they released a Christmas cover of "All I Want For Christmas Is You". WJSN officially debuted in February 2016 with their mini album Would You Like? with "MoMoMo" and "Catch Me" as the two lead singles.

2018–present: Debut with Rocket Girls 101, solo activities, and departure from WJSN

While juggling her acting and WJSN activities, Wu and bandmate, Meng Meiqi, participated in the Chinese reality survival girl group show Produce 101 aired from April 21 to June 23 on Tencent Video. Wu placed 2nd overall of 181,533,349 votes and debuted as a member of Rocket Girls 101.

On August 9, Yuehua Entertainment and Mavericks Entertainment released a joint announcement stating that they would be withdrawing Xuanyi along with Meiqi and Zining from Rocket Girls 101. Xuanyi and Meiqi are to resume their activities with WJSN. However, on August 17, both companies confirmed that after coming to an agreement with Tencent, that Xuanyi would be returning to group with Meiqi and Zining.

A month before Xuanyi came back to China for Produce 101, her teammate Cheng Xiao invited her as a guest in a travel variety show on Tencent Video, Best Friends' Perfect Vacation. The two variety shows she joined after her debut with Rocket Girls 101 are Space Challenge (on Youku Video) and "Nice to Meet You" (on Zhejiang TV). She is also the leading actress of voice movie "Future Girlfriend Lab" released in November.

On March 3, 2023, Starship Entertainment announced that Xuanyi had departed from WJSN after her contract expired.

Discography

Singles

Filmography

Films

Television series

Television shows

Awards and nominations

Notes

References

External links
 

1995 births
Living people
Actresses from Hainan
Singers from Hainan
People from Haikou
Chinese K-pop singers
Korean-language singers of China
Chinese expatriates in South Korea
Cosmic Girls members
Rocket Girls 101 members
Starship Entertainment artists
Chinese Mandopop singers
Produce 101 (Chinese TV series) contestants